Quinoline Yellow SS is a bright yellow dye with green shade.  It is insoluble in water, but soluble in nonpolar organic solvents.  Quinoline yellow is representative of a large class of quinophthalone pigments. It is suggested that quinoline yellow exhibits excited-state intramolecular proton transfer (ESIPT) behavior and the behavior might be the cause of its decent photostability, by recent spectroscopic study.

Synthesis and reactions
As first described in 1878, the dye is prepared by the fusion of phthalic anhydride and quinaldine.  The compound exists as a mixture of two tautomers.  Using other anhydrides and other quinaldine derivatives other dyes in the quinophthalone family can be prepared.

When sulfonated, it converts to a water-soluble derivative, Quinoline Yellow WS.

Uses and safety
Quinoline Yellow SS is used in spirit lacquers, polystyrene, polycarbonates, polyamides, acrylic resins, and to color hydrocarbon solvents. It is also used in externally applied drugs and cosmetics. Quinoline Yellow SS is used in some yellow colored smoke formulations.

It may cause contact dermatitis.

References

Quinoline dyes
Staining dyes
Solvent dyes
Indandiones